Givat Moshe, also known as Gush Shemonim, is a Haredi Jewish neighborhood in Jerusalem bordering on Sanhedria, Mahanayim, Ezrat Torah, Shikun Chabad, and Tel Arza.

History
Givat Moshe is home to numerous yeshivas and Hasidic synagogues. It is named after Rabbi Moshe Porush, a Haredi politician from Agudat Yisrael.

Yeshivas 

 Yeshivas Givat Shaul
 Brisk Yeshiva of Rabbi Meshulam Dovid Soloveitchik
 Yeshivas Meor Einayim of Rachmastrivka
 Yeshivat Kaf HaChaim, Baal Teshuvah yeshiva
 Yeshivat Or LeZion
 Yeshiva Torah VeEmunah, Baal Teshuvah yeshiva established by Belz
 Yeshivas Avnei Nezer of Sochatchov
 Yeshivat Tiferet Yaakov
 Yeshivas Tiferes HaTalmud
 Yeshivas HaRema of Rabbi Chaim Uri Freund, member of Badatz Edah HaChareidis

Synagogues 

 Rachmastrivka Beth Midrash
 Shidlovtza (Hasidic community)
 Toras Chacham of Rabbi Yitzchak Meir Morgenstern 
 Synagogue of Rabbi Yitzchak Tuvia Weiss of the Edah HaChareidis
 Seret-Vizhnitz synagogue
 Bet HaKnesset Shevet HaLevi
 Ohel Moshe of Rabbi Don Segal
 Or Avraham (Breslov)
 Ma'ayanei Yisrael (Chabad)
 Amshinov synagogue
 Beit HaLevi (Yemenite)
 Yad Yechiel Yonah (Yemenite)

References 

Neighbourhoods of Jerusalem
Haredi Judaism in Jerusalem